Alexander O. Babcock (December 21, 1816 –  July 3, 1874) was a member of the Wisconsin State Assembly.

Biography
A native of Homer, New York, Babcock moved to East Troy, Wisconsin in 1843. He died in 1874.

Career
Babcock was a member of the Assembly in 1850. Additionally, he was a justice of the peace, Chairman of the Walworth County, Wisconsin Board of Supervisors and Attorney of Walworth County. He was a member of the Whig Party.

References

External links

People from Homer, New York
People from East Troy, Wisconsin
Members of the Wisconsin State Assembly
County supervisors in Wisconsin
American justices of the peace
Wisconsin lawyers
Wisconsin Whigs
19th-century American politicians
1874 deaths
1816 births
19th-century American judges
19th-century American lawyers